Mari Saarinen (born 30 July 1981) is a Finnish retired ice hockey forward and current assistant coach of Team Kuortane in the Naisten Liiga (NSML). She was the head coach of HPK Kiekkonaiset during the 2020–21 season. Her playing career was spent with the Tampereen Ilves in the Naisten SM-sarja and with the Finnish national team. She represented Finland at the 2006 and 2010 Winter Olympics, winning Olympic bronze in 2010.

Career stats

References

External links 
 
 

1981 births
Living people
People from Kangasala
Finnish ice hockey coaches
Finnish women's ice hockey forwards
Naisten Liiga (ice hockey) coaches
Ilves Naiset players
Ice hockey players at the 2006 Winter Olympics
Ice hockey players at the 2010 Winter Olympics
Medalists at the 2010 Winter Olympics
Olympic ice hockey players of Finland
Olympic bronze medalists for Finland
Olympic medalists in ice hockey
Sportspeople from Pirkanmaa